Allison Pohlman (née Starr; born October 6, 1977) is an American basketball coach and the current head coach of the Drake Bulldogs women's basketball team. She took over the position in April 2021, following Jennie Baranczyk's hiring at Oklahoma. Pohlman had been an associate head coach and assistant coach at Drake since 2007. Prior to Drake, she was an assistant coach at Northern Iowa, her alma mater, and served as associate head coach there from 2006 to 2007.

Playing career
A Wellsburg, Iowa native, playing at Northern Iowa, Pohlman was named to the Missouri Valley Conference's All-Freshman team and, in the three successive seasons, she was named All-MVC First Team and to the conference's All-Defensive Team. She finished her playing career with 1,463 points, 711 rebounds, and 274 steals. In 2011, she was inducted into the UNI Hall of Fame.

Coaching career
Pohlman began her coaching career as a graduate assistant at Northern Iowa for the 2000–01 season, before being promoted to an assistant coach the following season and associate head coach in 2006. She joined Drake prior to the 2007–08 season. When Baranczyk was named the head coach at Drake in 2012, she retained Pohlman and promoted her to associate head coach in 2014. Pohlman was also recruiting coordinator for Drake. She was promoted to head coach in April 2021.

Personal life
Pohlman and her husband Kirk are the parents of triplet daughters, Quinn, Rubie and Sidny, born July 30, 2006.

References

External links
 Bio at Drake Athletics
 Press release of Drake promotion

1977 births
American women's basketball coaches
Basketball coaches from Iowa
Basketball players from Iowa
Drake Bulldogs women's basketball coaches
Living people
Northern Iowa Panthers women's basketball players
University of Northern Iowa alumni
21st-century American women